Hyperandra novata is a moth of the subfamily Arctiinae first described by Paul Dognin in 1924. It is found in Brazil.

References

Phaegopterina